In mathematics, Katugampola fractional operators are integral operators that generalize the Riemann–Liouville and the Hadamard fractional operators into a unique form. The Katugampola fractional integral generalizes both the Riemann–Liouville fractional integral and the Hadamard fractional integral into a single form and It is also closely related to the Erdelyi–Kober operator that generalizes the Riemann–Liouville fractional integral. Katugampola fractional derivative has been defined using the Katugampola fractional integral and as with any other fractional differential operator, it also extends the possibility of taking real number powers or complex number powers of the integral and differential operators.

Definitions 
These operators have been defined on the following extended-Lebesgue space.

Katugampola fractional integral 
It is defined via the following integrals 

 
Similarly, the right-sided fractional integral is defined by,
 

 

These are the fractional generalizations of the -fold left- and right-integrals of the form

 

and

  for 

respectively. Even though the integral operators in question are close resemblance of the famous Erdélyi–Kober operator, it is not possible to obtain the Hadamard fractional integrals as a direct consequence of the Erdélyi–Kober operators. Also, there is a corresponding fractional derivative, which generalizes the Riemann–Liouville and the Hadamard fractional derivatives. As with the case of fractional integrals, the same is not true for the Erdélyi–Kober operator.

Katugampola fractional derivative 
As with the case of other fractional derivatives, it is defined via the Katugampola fractional integral.

and

respectively, if the integrals exist.

These operators generalize the Riemann–Liouville and Hadamard fractional derivatives into a single form, while the Erdelyi–Kober fractional is a generalization of the Riemann–Liouville fractional derivative. When, the fractional derivatives are referred to as Weyl-type derivatives.

Caputo–Katugampola fractional derivative 
There is a Caputo-type modification of the Katugampola derivative that is now known as the Caputo–Katugampola fractional derivative.
The C-K fractional derivative of order  of the function  with respect to parameter  can be expressed as

It satisfies the following result. Assume that , then the C-K derivative has the following equivalent form

Hilfer–Katugampola fractional derivative 
Another recent generalization is the Hilfer-Katugampola fractional derivative. Let order  and type . The fractional derivative (left-sided/right-sided),

where , for functions  in which the expression on the right hand side 
exists, where  is the generalized fractional integral 

Mellin transform 
As in the case of Laplace transforms, Mellin transforms will be used specially when solving differential equations. The Mellin transforms of the left-sided and right-sided versions of Katugampola Integral operators are given by

Theorem 
Let  and  Then,

Hermite-Hadamard type inequalities
Katugampola operators satisfy the following Hermite-Hadamard type inequalities:

Theorem 

where .

When , in the above result, the following Hadamard type inequality holds:

Corollary
Let .

Recent Development 
These operators have been mentioned in the following works:
 Fractional Calculus. An Introduction for Physicists, by Richard Herrmann 
 Fractional Calculus of Variations in Terms of a Generalized Fractional Integral with Applications to Physics, Tatiana Odzijewicz, Agnieszka B. Malinowska and Delfim F. M. Torres, Abstract and Applied Analysis, Vol 2012 (2012), Article ID 871912, 24 pages 
 Introduction to the Fractional Calculus of Variations, Agnieszka B Malinowska and Delfim F. M. Torres, Imperial College Press, 2015
 Advanced Methods in the Fractional Calculus of Variations, Malinowska, Agnieszka B., Odzijewicz, Tatiana, Torres, Delfim F.M., Springer, 2015
 Expansion formulas in terms of integer-order derivatives for the Hadamard fractional integral and derivative'', Shakoor Pooseh, Ricardo Almeida, and Delfim F. M. Torres, Numerical Functional Analysis and Optimization, Vol 33, Issue 3, 2012, pp 301–319.

References

Further reading

Notes 
The CRONE (R) Toolbox, a Matlab and Simulink Toolbox dedicated to fractional calculus, can be downloaded at http://cronetoolbox.ims-bordeaux.fr

Fractional calculus